Attorney General Howe may refer to:

Gerard Lewis Howe (1899–1955), Attorney General of Nigeria
James Henry Howe (1827–1893), Attorney General of Wisconsin

See also
General Howe (disambiguation)